Stubb Place is a small settlement in western Cumbria, England. Known by locals in Waberthwaite as marshside, due to the name of the nearby cottages. It lies within the Lake District National Park.

External links
Stub Place at geodaisy

Hamlets in Cumbria
Bootle, Cumbria